The 2021 East Sussex County Council election took place alongside the other local elections. All 50 seats to East Sussex County Council were up for election.

Summary

Election result

|-

Results by Division

Eastbourne

Division results

Hastings

Lewes

The incumbent Independent Ruth O'Keeffe did not stand for re-election.

The incumbent Philip Boorman previously stood for the Conservative Party

Rother

Deirdre Earl-Williams vote share is calculated on the 2019 Bexhill West By-Election that she won following the death of her husband, the former incumbent Stuart Earl.

Wealden

Daniel Dak Yan Shing previously stood as a Liberal Democrat before leaving the party due to his father's expulsion for bringing the party into disrepute. 

Bob Bowdler was the previous incumbent in Hailsham Market (Wealden)

Stephen Sai Hung Shing was previously an elected councillor for the Liberal Democrats before being expelled for bringing the party into disrepute.

References 

East Sussex County Council elections
2021 English local elections
2020s in East Sussex